Colonel George Durston was a collective pseudonym used by the Saalfield Publishing Company as the author of various American series books.

Durston is credited for the "Boy Scouts" series, 24 volumes originally published by Saalfield between 1912 and 1919. Ghostwriters for the series included Frederick Dey, J.W. Duffield, William A. Wolf, and Georgia Roberts Durston. Col. Durston was also credited with the Potter Brother books, which appeared in the six-book "Stars and Stripes" Series.

External links
 
 
 

House names